Evance Malenga (born 12 September 1967) is a former Malawian featherweight boxer. He competed at the 1988 Summer Olympics, where he finished in thirty-third place.

References

1967 births
Living people
Malawian male boxers
Olympic boxers of Malawi
Boxers at the 1988 Summer Olympics
Featherweight boxers